The women's 1500 metres race of the 2014–15 ISU Speed Skating World Cup 5, arranged in the Vikingskipet arena in Hamar, Norway, was held on 31 January 2015.

Heather Richardson of the United States won, followed by Brittany Bowe of the United States in second place, and Marije Joling of the Netherlands in third place. Carlijn Achtereekte of the Netherlands won Division B.

Elena Møller-Rigas of Denmark set a new national junior record in the B division.

Results
The race took place on Saturday, 31 January, with Division B scheduled in the morning session, at 09:15, and Division A scheduled in the afternoon session, at 14:00.

Division A

Division B

Note: NRJ = national record for juniors.

References

Women 1500
5